Indira Anant Maydeo was an Indian parliamentarian who represented Pune South in the 1st Lok Sabha as a member of the Indian National Congress.

Early life
Born on 7 September 1903, Maydeo attended the Fergusson College, from where she received her B.Sc. degree.

Career
Maydeo was actively involved in the Indian independence movement and was a member of the Indian National Congress (INC). In 1933, she joined the Maharashtra division of Harijan Sevak Sangh. She was the most prominent women member of the party in Pune (then in Bombay State) and when the first general elections of independent India were held, the INC made her its official candidate for Pune South constituency. Maydeo obtained roughly 64% of the votes cast and defeated the Socialist Party candidate Shridhar Limaye to become the first women representative of Pune in the house. She still holds this record. As a Member of Parliament, she brought a bill in the Lok Sabha concerning divorce but it was not discussed and eventually lapsed. Maydeo became the president of National Students' Union of India in 1952.

Personal life
Indira married Anant Govind Maydeo in 1927, from whom she had one son and three daughters.

References

1903 births
Year of death missing
India MPs 1952–1957
Women members of the Lok Sabha
Lok Sabha members from Maharashtra
Indian National Congress politicians from Maharashtra
Fergusson College alumni
Politicians from Pune
Indian independence activists from Maharashtra